S. M. Sabry was the 35th Auditor General of Sri Lanka. He was appointed on 26 January 1993, succeeding W. Gamini Epa, and held the office until 13 August 2000. He was succeeded by Sarath Chandrasiri Mayadunne.

References

Auditors General of Sri Lanka